Wanakawri (Quechua, also spelled Guanacaure, Guanacauri, Huanacaure, Huanacauri, Wanacaure, Wanacauri, Wanakaure, Wanakauri) is an archaeological site and a legendary mountain in Peru. It is situated in the Cusco Region, Cusco Province, in the districts San Jerónimo and San Sebastián, and in the Paruro Province, Yaurisque District.

Wanakawri was one of the most important wak'as of the Inca culture.

Gallery

See also 
 Anawarkhi
 Araway Qhata
 Muyu Urqu
 Pachatusan
 Pikchu
 Pillku Urqu
 Sinqa
 Wayna Tawqaray

References 

Archaeological sites in Peru
Archaeological sites in Cusco Region
Mountains of Peru
Mountains of Cusco Region